Mount Duff, also called Auorotini in the Mangarevan language, is the highest peak on the island of Mangareva in the Gambier Islands, French Polynesia. It has an elevation of 441 m. The peak was named by James Wilson after the ship Duff, which carried missionaries of the London Missionary Society to Tahiti.

References

Duff
Geography of the Gambier Islands